The men's singles competition at the 2021 FIL European Luge Championships was held on 9 January 2021.

Results
The first run was held at 11:33 and the second run at 13:05.

References

Men's singles